The Canadian Journal of Remote Sensing (French: Journal canadien de télédétection) is an academic journal about remote sensing published by Taylor & Francis on behalf of the Canadian Remote Sensing Society and the Canadian Aeronautics and Space Institute. Its editor-in-chief is Monique Bernier; its 2020 impact factor is 2.000.

See also
Cartographica

References

Remote sensing journals
Taylor & Francis academic journals
Academic journals associated with learned and professional societies of Canada